The Serb Democratic League in the Ottoman Empire was an Ottoman Serb political organisation established on August 13, 1908, at the First Serb Conference (August 10–13), immediately after the Young Turk Revolution.

It included the Serb elite of Old Raška, Kosovo and Metohija, and Vardar Macedonia and Aegean Macedonia. It included many members of the Serbian Chetnik Organization.

See also

Serb People's Radical Party, political party in Austria-Hungary
Serb Independent Party, political party in Austria-Hungary
Narodna Odbrana, Serbian nationalist group

References

Sources

Political parties in the Ottoman Empire
Politics of the Ottoman Empire
1908 establishments in the Ottoman Empire
History of the Serbs
Ottoman Serbia
Ottoman period in the history of North Macedonia
Ottoman period in the history of Kosovo
Kosovo vilayet
20th century in Skopje
Serbs from the Ottoman Empire
Serb organizations